The 2001–02 season was Port Vale's 90th season of football in the English Football League, and second successive season (39th overall) in the Second Division. On the pitch Vale finished in mid-table, whilst exiting both the FA Cup and the League Cup at the Second Round, and the League Trophy at the Area Quarter-finals. Behind the scenes the club was heading for administration.

Overview

Second Division
The pre-season saw Brian Horton sign numerous bit-part players on free transfers: Ashley Dodd (Manchester United); Ian Armstrong (Liverpool); Phil Hardy (an eleven-year Wrexham veteran); Rae Ingram (Macclesfield Town); and Alex Gibson (Stoke City). He also signed Stephen McPhee from Coventry City, who would go on to become a key player for the club.

The season opened with six points from three games, though this was followed by just one point from six games. In September, after failing secure Paul Hall's signature, New Zealand international striker Chris Killen was signed on loan from Manchester City. Simon Osborn also joined from Wolverhampton Wanderers on a one-month contract, before he moved on to Gillingham. In October, Steve Torpey was allowed to join Scarborough on a one-month loan. Arriving in Burslem was Sean McClare, who joined on a one-month loan from Barnsley, before signing permanently when the loan deal finished. Frenchman Johan Gallon also had a trial at the club, but was not offered a contract. On 21 October, Vale played rivals Stoke City, and McPhee scored for Vale, before Chris Iwelumo buried a late equaliser for the "Potters". The next month Danny Webber was taken in on loan from Manchester United. Vale continued through the Christmas period in inconsistent form, despite the arrival of 36-year-old John Durnin. In January, Mvondo Atangana became the first Cameroonian to play for the Vale, when he joined on loan from Dundee United – he would only play two games before picking up a serious injury. Meanwhile, Richard Burgess was allowed to join Nuneaton Borough permanently. Vale then went on a sequence of seven wins in eight games to shoot up the table, including a 1–0 win over Stoke at the Britannia Stadium thanks to a Micky Cummins header, as Horton was named Manager of the Month. The 23,019 attendance at Stoke was the highest at any match in the division during the season, whereas the 2,379 that saw the 1–0 win at Cambridge United three days later was the lowest attendance figure. This run raised hopes of a play-off bid. It also encouraged chairman Bill Bell to offer new contracts to the management team (Horton, Grew, Foyle and Glover), as well as seven players. Horton was also awarded the Manager of the Month award for February. Vale finished in poor form however, winning just one of their final eleven games.

Vale finished in fourteenth place with 58 points, quite some distance from either the play-offs or the relegation zone. The team lost 14 of their 23 league games away from home. Stoke finished nine places and 22 points above the Vale, and won promotion via the play-offs, never to meet the Vale again for the rest of the decade. McPhee hit fourteen goals to become the club's top-scorer, with Brooker and Cummins close behind in the scoring charts. Cummins was also an ever-present. Overworked goalkeeper Mark Goodlad was voted Player of the Year.

At the end of the season numerous players were allowed to leave on a free transfers: Sagi Burton (Crewe Alexandra); George O'Callaghan (Cork City); Danny Maye (Southend United); Paul Donnelly (Stone Dominoes); Steve Torpey (Prescot Cables); and Phil Hardy. Durnin also turned his hand to coaching, and was appointed as the club's under-17 coach.

Finances
The collapse of ITV Digital cost the club £400,000 in revenue. Chairman Bill Bell announced a 30% cut in the players' wage budget at the end of the campaign. These ominous warnings belied a financial crisis that would hit the club hard the following season. In August, former chairman Jim Lloyd returned to the club as a director. The next month, Chief Executive Dave Jolley was sacked. A Charles Machin led consortium made a £1 million bid for the club in December, but were turned away by Bill Bell, who claimed that Valiant2001 "won't last three months". Later in the month former commercial director Neil Hughes was arrested for fraud for allegedly stealing £20,000 from the club; he denied the offence. The club's debt stood at £1.7 million in February. The next month the Football Association's compliance unit began an investigation into the club, but found no wrongdoing. The club's shirt sponsors were Tunstall Assurance.

Cup competitions
In the FA Cup, Vale avoided losing to a non-league club for the second successive season by beating Aylesbury United 3–0 at Vale Park. They had been held by the "Ducks" 0–0 at half-time, and the non-league side seemed to have taken the lead on 52 minutes until captain Scott Honeyball's headed goal was disallowed for an infringement; Burgess then put the Vale ahead two minutes later before Cummins and Brooker made the game safe. They exited at the Second Round after a 3–0 defeat to Cardiff City at Ninian Park.

In the League Cup, for the second consecutive season Vale faced Third Division Chesterfield in the First Round, this time however the two-legged format was scrapped in favour of a standard knock-out tournament structure. Vale progressed with a 2–1 win thanks to a brace from McPhee. It was a bad-tempered affair, with three sendings-off. Facing Premier League Charlton Athletic at The Valley in the Second Round, Alan Curbishley's men eliminated the Vale with a 2–0 win.

In the League Trophy, Vale advanced past Carlisle United and Rochdale to reach the Area Quarter-finals. where they faced Hull City at Boothferry Park. The "Tigers" eliminated the "Valiants" with a 2–1 win.

League table

Results
Port Vale's score comes first

Football League Second Division

Results by matchday

Matches

FA Cup

League Cup

League Trophy

Player statistics

Appearances

Top scorers

Transfers

Transfers in

Transfers out

Loans in

Loans out

References
Specific

General
Soccerbase

Port Vale F.C. seasons
Port Vale